Santos Reyes Tepejillo is a town and municipality in Oaxaca in south-western Mexico. The municipality covers an area of  km² and is part of the Juxtlahuaca District of the Mixteca Region. 

Aparicio Reyes, municipal president, became the 14th municipal president of Oaxaca to die of COVID-19 on January 31, 2021. As of February 18, there were seven confirmed cases and one death in the municipality due to the pandemic.

References

Municipalities of Oaxaca